ATP11C is an enzyme that in humans is encoded by the ATP11C gene.

Function 

ATP11C encodes a member of the Type IV P-type ATPase family that is thought to transport or 'flip' aminophospholipids. The corresponding protein in mice is essential for the development of B cells and red blood cells, and for the prevention of intrahepatic cholestasis.

References

Enzymes